Break It Yourself  is American singer-songwriter Andrew Bird's sixth solo studio album, released on March 5, 2012 through Mom+Pop records in the US and Bella Union in the UK.
The track "Lusitania" features a duet with Annie Clark from St. Vincent.

Critical reception

The album was well received by critics: according to Metacritic, the album has received an average review score of 80/100, based on 33 reviews.

The album debuted on the Billboard 200 at No. 10, which is Bird's first top 10 entry in the chart, selling 30,000 copies in the first week.

Track listing

Other Appearances
 Instrumental versions of "Danse Caribe" and "Eyeoneye" appear on Fingerlings 4. They are titled "Danse Carribe" and "Oh Baltimore" respectively
 A slower version of "Orpheo Looks Back" (called "Orpheo") appears on Hands of Glory

Personnel
The Band
Andrew Bird - violin, guitar, vocals, whistling
Martin Dosh - drums
Jeremy Ylvisaker - guitar, keyboards, background vocals
Mike Lewis - bass, tenor saxophone, background vocals

Additional Musicians
J. T. Bates - drums on "Danse Caribe"
Annie Clark (St. Vincent) - vocals on "Lusitania", courtesy of 4AD
Nora O'Connor - vocal harmonies on "Give It Away", "Lazy Projector", "Near Death Experience Experience", "Fatal Shore"
Simone White - vocal harmony on "Desperation Breeds"
Wendy Lewis - cooking, moral support

Charts

References

Andrew Bird albums
2012 albums
Mom + Pop Music albums